Gervan (also Romanized as Gervān and Garrevān) is a village in Beyza Rural District, Beyza District, Sepidan County, Fars Province, Iran. At the 2006 census, its population was 205, in 50 families.

References 

Populated places in Beyza County